China participated in the 2010 Asian Para Games–First Asian Para Games in Guangzhou, China from 13 to 19 December 2010. Athletes from China led all the medal categories, winning more than half of the total gold medals (185), the most silver medals (118), the most bronze medals (88) and the most medals overall (391, nearly 38 percent of all medals awarded).

References

Nations at the 2010 Asian Para Games
2010 in Chinese sport
China at the Asian Para Games